M96 or M-96 may refer to:

 M96 (New York City bus), a New York City Bus route in Manhattan
 Messier 96, an intermediate spiral galaxy about 31 million light-years away in the constellation Leo
 M-96 (Michigan highway), a state highway in Michigan
 M96 motorway, a mock motorway used by the Fire Service College in England
 Robinson Armament M96 Expeditionary, a semi-automatic rifle chambered for the 5.56×45mm NATO round